National Standards for United States History was the controversial 1994 publication by the National Center for History in the Schools unit of the  University of Southern California, that resulted in a robust debate—sometimes referred to as the culture or history wars. The administration of then United States President George H. W. Bush had funded the three-year $2M research project, and "several thousand teachers, educators, officials, and scholars" had participated in its preparation. While some scholars called it a "remarkable achievement in the history of the humanities", there were numerous vocal reform skeptics. These debates over state-school history curricula in the United States in the mid-1990s were influenced by the culture wars, in which education reform skeptics, including prominent public figures as Lynne Cheney, Rush Limbaugh, and American Enterprise Institute fellows responded to the "Standards" in numerous scathing publications and interviews, starting in October 1994, before its official publication.

Overview
The 3-year $2M government-sponsored project was led by Gary Nash, then Director of the National Center for History in the Schools unit of the  University of Southern California, and co-chaired by Charlotte Crabtree, "an expert on K-12 social studies". The National Center for History in the Schools was mandated to develop standards on how American students would be taught both world history and American history in American schools. This was part of a wider response to the 1989 decision by fifty governors of American states to  adopt National Education Goals for "science, civics, geography, and the arts". The 32-month long process included five draft publications produced as a result of the contributions of "several thousand teachers, educators, officials, and scholars". Funding included a 1992 $525,000 grant from National Endowment for the Humanities (NEH) then chaired by Lynn Cheney, and $525,000 from the Department of Education, then under Lamar Alexander.

The first three publications in November 1994 included National Standards for United States History, National Standards for World History, and National Standards for Grades K-4.

Considered an historical achievement by some, it was disparaged by education reform skeptics.

Culture wars

These debates over state-school history curricula in the United States in the mid-1990s were influenced by the culture wars, in which education reform skeptics, including prominent public figures as Lynne Cheney, Rush Limbaugh, and American Enterprise Institute fellows responded to the "Standards" in numerous publications and interviews, starting in October 1994, before its official publication. They said that American history should be a "celebratory" and traditional, while the report called for a more "critical" revisiting of the past as reflected in the Standards project under the direction of  historian Gary Nash. 

Cheney—who was a signatory of the National Center's NEH grant and the Department of Education grant—wrote a scathing October 24 Wall Street Journal editorial entitled "The End of History"—which is also the title of Francis Fukuyama's 1989 talk and 1992 book. Cheney said saying that the new Standards included too much Harriet Tubman and not enough Ulysses S. Grant and Robert E. Lee.

During a two-week period in November, Rush Limbaugh, among others, including John Fonte, an education consultant, who directed the committee to Review National Standards under Cheney at the American Enterprise Institute, wrote strongly-worded critiques in opinion pieces in Wall Street Journal. Fonte had completed his PhD in world history at the University of Chicago—a department that had earned prominence for world history with William H. McNeill (1917–2016) as chair in the 1960s. McNeill's award-winning book, The Rise of the West, traced 5,000 years of civilizations'  recorded history. Fonte was cited in the media as saying that while it is important to include "previously neglected groups and individuals"—Harriet Tubman, for example—and admitting that we should acknowledge the "our countries tragedies and triumphs" he called their inclusion in the Standards as "proof" the Standards were steeped in political correctness." In a 1995, AEI article, Cheney said that Fonte had worked with Robert Lerner and Althea Nagai—two social scientists—to review the Standards. Lerner and Nagai found that there were numerous "occurrences of the race, ethnicity and gender theme" and very few on "the theme of political freedom." One of the stated goals of the AEI is to defend the expansion of freedom and to strengthen "free enterprise system in America and around the world" against perceived threats.

References

American culture
Christian fundamentalism
Cultural politics
Political terminology of the United States